Wandsworth is a district in south London, England

Wandsworth can also refer to:
London Borough of Wandsworth, London, established 1965
Metropolitan Borough of Wandsworth, London, existed from 1900 to 1965
Wandsworth District (Metropolis), London, existed from 1855 to 1900
Wandsworth, New South Wales, Australia
Wandsworth, Newfoundland and Labrador, Canada
HM Prison Wandsworth, London